The Broken Hill railway line is now part of the transcontinental railway from Sydney to Perth.

New South Wales's first line opened from Sydney to Parramatta Junction (near Granville Station) in 1855 and was extended as the Main Western line in stages to Orange in 1877. The Broken Hill line branched off the Main Western line at Orange and was opened to Molong in 1885. It was extended to Parkes and Forbes in 1893. This line was extended from Parkes to Bogan Gate and Condobolin in 1898 and Roto and Trida in 1919.

An isolated section of  line was also opened from Menindee to the town of Broken Hill in 1919, which met the  gauge Silverton Tramway at a break-of-gauge. At Cockburn, the Silverton Tramway connected with the South Australian Railways system to Port Pirie and via a break of gauge at Terowie to Adelaide. The final missing link between Trida and Menindee was completed in 1927. The Broken Hill Express, running from Sydney to Broken Hill, was introduced from November 1927. Included in its composition was Dining Car AB90, making it the first regularly scheduled Dining Car in that state. In 1970, the standardised Broken Hill – Port Pirie line was opened, completing the Sydney–Perth standard gauge link. Today, the line is utilised by the Outback Xplorer from  Sydney Central to Broken Hill, as well as the transcontinental Indian Pacific from Sydney to Perth.

Branch line
A branch line was opened from Molong to Dubbo as an alternative route with better grades in 1925. It closed in 1987. Another branch line was opened from Bogan Gate to Trundle in 1907, Tullamore in 1908 and Tottenham in 1916.

Crossing loops

See also
 Rail transport in New South Wales

Notes

References
 McCarthy K. Steaming down Argent Street. Sydney Tramway Museum, Sutherland. 1983.

Regional railway lines in New South Wales
Standard gauge railways in Australia
Far West (New South Wales)
Transport in Broken Hill, New South Wales